Glyphipterix imparfasciata is a species of sedge moths in the genus Glyphipterix. It was described by Yutaka Arita in 1979. It is found in Japan.

The wingspan is about 10 mm.

References

Moths described in 1979
Glyphipterigidae
Moths of Japan